A grasp generally refers to an act of taking, holding or seizing firmly with (or as if with) the hand.

Grasp or GRASP may also refer to:

Software:
 Graphics Animation System for Professionals, the first multimedia animation program for the IBM PC
 GRASP (multimedia authoring software), a multimedia authoring software
 Grasp (software), a spooler for DOS and DOS/VSE
 GRASP (object-oriented design), General Responsibility Assignment Software Patterns (or Principles)
 GRASP, the previous version of Jgrasp, a graphical source code editor
 General Purpose Relativistic Atomic Structure Program, developed by Ian Grant and others for relativistic atomic structure calculations

Computer science:
 Greedy randomized adaptive search procedure
 GRASP (SAT solver), an SAT instance solver

Ships:
 , a United States Navy rescue and salvage ship
 , a United States Navy rescue and salvage ship

Other uses:
 Glaciogenic Reservoir Analogue Studies Project, a collaborative project in glacially-related sedimentary systems
 Grace St. Paul's Episcopal Church or GraSP Church, an Episcopal church in Trenton, New Jersey, United States
 Great Apes Survival Project

See also
 Grab (disambiguation)